Paul Sheppard (born 12 January 1978 in Newbridge), is a Welsh racing cyclist. He represented Wales at 1998 Commonwealth Games in Kuala Lumpur where he came fourth in the Team Pursuit, he repeated this performance at the 2002 Commonwealth Games in Manchester.

Palmarès

Track
1993
1st Pursuit British National Track Championships – Youth

1995
1st 20 km Scratch, British National Track Championships – Junior

1998
4th Team Pursuit, 4m28.664, Commonwealth Games (with Huw Pritchard, Alun Owen & Sion Jones)

2002
4th Team Pursuit, 4m25.029, Commonwealth Games (with Huw Pritchard, Will Wright & Joby Ingram-Dodd)

2004
1st Pursuit, Welsh National Track Championships
1st Team Sprint, Welsh National Track Championships

2005
1st Points Race, Welsh National Track Championships
1st Scratch Race, Welsh National Track Championships
1st Team Pursuit, Welsh National Track Championships

Road
2001
1st Welsh National Road Race Championships

2004
2nd Perfs Pedal Race

External links
2002 Commonwealth Games profile

1978 births
Living people
Cyclists at the 1998 Commonwealth Games
Cyclists at the 2002 Commonwealth Games
Commonwealth Games competitors for Wales
Welsh track cyclists
Welsh male cyclists
People from Newbridge, Caerphilly
Sportspeople from Caerphilly County Borough